The 1987 South American Cross Country Championships took place on June 7, 1987.  The races were held in Santiago, Chile.

Complete results, results for junior and youth competitions, and medal winners were published.

Medallists

Race results

Senior men's race (12 km)

Junior (U20) men's race (8 km)

Senior women's race (8 km)

Junior (U20) women's race (6 km)

Medal table (unofficial)

Participation
According to an unofficial count, 23 athletes from 2 countries participated.

 (11)
 (12)

See also
 1987 in athletics (track and field)

References

External links
 GBRathletics

South American Cross Country Championships
South American Cross Country Championships
South American Cross Country Championships
International athletics competitions hosted by Chile
Cross country running in Chile
June 1987 sports events in South America